Kongo class may refer to either:

 , a class of ironclad corvettes in service with the Imperial Japanese Navy during the late nineteenth century
 , a class of battlecruisers in service with the Imperial Japanese Navy during World War I and II
 , a class of destroyer currently in service with the Japan Maritime Self-Defense Force